Kupati is a type of Georgian sausage that is made from ground pork, intestines or chitterlings, pepper, onions. It is popular in the Caucasus region.

See also
 List of sausages

References

Cuisine of Georgia (country)
Fresh sausages